Gustav Weder (born 2 August 1961 in Diepoldsau) is a Swiss bobsledder who competed from the late 1980s to the early 1990s. Competing in three Winter Olympics, he won four medals with two gold (Two-man: 1992, 1994), one silver (Four-man: 1994), and one bronze (Four-man: 1992).

Weder also won eight medals at the FIBT World Championships with four golds (Two-man: 1990, Four-man: 1989, 1990, 1993) and four silvers (Two-man: 1989, 1991, 1993; Four-man: 1991).

He was also a Bobsleigh World Cup champion four times (Combined men's: 1988-9, 1990-1; Two-man: 1988-9, Four-man: 1990-1).

Known for his intensity, Weder would videotape every one of his bobsleigh runs he raced on and study those videos for hours. It was so intense that Weder was caught one night during the FIBT World Championships 1990 in St. Moritz scrapping ice off of a difficult corner on the track. Bobsleigh officials allowed him to compete, and he won his second world championship in the four-man Event.

After studies in Switzerland and Canada, Weder finished his education with a PhD with Arnd Krüger in Social Sciences at the University of Göttingen. He has been working in Human Resources for major Swiss companies.

References
Bobsleigh two-man Olympic medalists 1932-56 and since 1964
Bobsleigh four-man Olympic medalists for 1924, 1932-56, and since 1964
Bobsleigh two-man world championship medalists since 1931
Bobsleigh four-man world championship medalists since 1930
 
List of combined men's bobsleigh World Cup champions: 1985-2007
List of four-man bobsleigh World Cup champions since 1985
List of two-man bobsleigh World Cup champions since 1985
Wallechinsky, David and Jaime Loucky (2009). "Bobsleigh: Two-Man". In The Complete Book of the Winter Olympics: 2010 Edition. London: Aurum Press Limited. p. 159.

External links
 
 

1961 births
Living people
Swiss male bobsledders
Olympic medalists in bobsleigh
Olympic bobsledders of Switzerland
Bobsledders at the 1988 Winter Olympics
Bobsledders at the 1992 Winter Olympics
Bobsledders at the 1994 Winter Olympics
Olympic gold medalists for Switzerland
Olympic silver medalists for Switzerland
Olympic bronze medalists for Switzerland
Medalists at the 1992 Winter Olympics
Medalists at the 1994 Winter Olympics
20th-century Swiss people